Yemisi is a Yoruba given name. It is unisex. Notable people with this name include:
Yemisi Aribisala Nigerian essayist
Yemisi Adedoyin Shyllon Nigerian prince
Yemisi Ransome-Kuti Chief Pharmacist for the Federation of Nigeria

Yoruba given names
Yoruba-language surnames